Marcia Regina Cunha (born 26 July 1969), known as Marcia Fu, is a retired Brazilian female volleyball player. She participated with the Brazil women's national volleyball team at the 1988 Summer Olympics, 1992 Summer Olympics and 1996 Summer Olympics,  winning the bronze medal at the 1996 Summer Olympics.  She participated at the 1994 FIVB Volleyball Women's World Championship in Brazil.

Clubs

References

External links
 Márcia Cunha  at the International Olympic Committee website

Brazilian women's volleyball players
Living people
1969 births
People from Juiz de Fora
Olympic volleyball players of Brazil
Volleyball players at the 1996 Summer Olympics
Volleyball players at the 1992 Summer Olympics
Volleyball players at the 1988 Summer Olympics
Olympic medalists in volleyball
Olympic bronze medalists for Brazil
Medalists at the 1996 Summer Olympics
Pan American Games medalists in volleyball
Pan American Games silver medalists for Brazil
Volleyball players at the 1991 Pan American Games
Medalists at the 1991 Pan American Games
Sportspeople from Minas Gerais
20th-century Brazilian women